Lambert van der Burch (1542–1617) was a clergyman and historian from the Habsburg Netherlands.

Life
Lambert was born in Mechelen on 8 August 1542, the son of Adrien van der Burch. He became a canon of St. Mary's Church, Utrecht in 1555, and on 9 December 1578 was appointed dean of the chapter. 

He sat in the States of Utrecht until 1582, when he was excluded as a Catholic. After a long exile in the Duchy of Cleves he returned to Utrecht, where he was appointed scholaster in 1605. He died in Utrecht on 17 August 1617.

Writings
 Sabaudorum ducum principumque historiae gentilitae (1599)
 Guidonis Comitis Flandriae Vita (1615)
 Preces rythmicae latines ad divam virginem; origo  admiranda et fundatio ecclesiae collegiatae D. Virginis Ultrajecti
 Historia comitum Flandriae (manuscript)

References

1542 births
1617 deaths
Clergy from Mechelen
Habsburg Netherlands historians
Writers from Mechelen
Roman Catholic priests of the Habsburg Netherlands